In Buddhism, parinirvana is commonly used to refer to nirvana-after-death, which occurs upon the death of someone who has attained nirvana during their lifetime.

In some Mahāyāna scriptures, notably the Mahāyāna Mahāparinirvāṇa Sūtra, parinirvāṇa is described as the realm of the eternal true Self of the Buddha.

In the Buddha in art, the event is represented by a reclining Buddha figure, often surrounded by disciples.

Nirvana after death

In the Buddhist view, when ordinary people die, each person's unresolved karma passes on to a new birth instantaneously; and thus the karmic inheritance is reborn in one of the six realms of samsara. However, when a person attains nirvana, they are liberated from karmic rebirth. When such a person dies, it is the end of the cycle of rebirth, the Samsara and the Karma.

Contemporary scholar Rupert Gethin explains:

Parinirvana of Buddha Shakyamuni

Accounts of the purported events surrounding the Buddha's own parinirvāṇa are found in a wide range of Buddhist canonical literature. In addition to the Pāli Mahāparinibbāna sutta (DN 16) and its Sanskrit parallels, the topic is treated in the Saṃyutta-nikāya (SN 6.15) and the several Sanskrit parallels (T99 p253c-254c), the Sanskrit-based Ekottara-āgama (T125 p750c), and other early sutras preserved in Chinese, as well as in most of the Vinayas preserved in Chinese of the early Buddhist schools such as the Sarvāstivādins and the Mahāsāṃghikas. The historical event of the Buddha's parinirvāṇa is also described in a number of later works, such as the Sanskrit Buddhacarita and the Avadāna-śataka, and the Pāli Mahāvaṃsa.

According to Bareau, the oldest core components of all these accounts are just the account of the Buddha's parinirvāṇa itself at Kuśinagara and the funerary rites following his death. He deems all other extended details to be later additions with little historical value.

Within the Mahaparinibbana Sutta (Pali)
The parinirvana of the Buddha is described in the Mahaparinibbana Sutta. Because of its attention to detail, this Theravada sutta, though first committed to writing hundreds of years after his death, has been resorted to as the principal source of reference in most standard studies of the Buddha's life.

Within the Mahāyāna Mahāparinirvāṇa sūtra
In contrast to these works which deal with the Buddha's parinirvāṇa as a biographical event, the Mahāyāna Mahāparinirvāṇa sūtra was written hundreds of years later. The Nirvana Sutra does not give details of the historical event of the day of the parinirvāṇa itself, except the Buddha's illness and Cunda's meal offering, nor any of the other preceding or subsequent incidents, instead using the event as merely a convenient springboard for the expression of standard Mahayana ideals such as the tathagata-garbha/buddha-dhatu doctrine, the eternality of the Buddha, and the soteriological fate of the icchantikas and so forth.

Location of Gautama Buddha's death and parinirvana
It has been suggested by Waddell that the site of the death and parinirvana of Gautama Buddha was in the region of Rampurva: "I believe that Kusīnagara, where the Buddha died may be ultimately found to the North of Bettiah, and in the line of the Aśōka pillars which lead hither from Patna (Pāțaliputra)" in Bihar. It still awaits proper archaeological excavation.

In Mahayana literature

According to the Mahāyāna Mahāparinirvāṇa Sūtra (also called the Nirvana Sutra), the Buddha taught that parinirvāṇa is the realm of the Eternal, Bliss, the Self, and the Pure. Dr. Paul Williams states that it depicts the Buddha using the term "Self" in order to win over non-Buddhist ascetics. However, the Mahaparinirvana Sutra is a long and highly composite Mahayana scripture, and the part of the sutra upon which Williams is basing his statement is a portion of the Nirvana Sutra of secondary Central Asian provenance - other parts of the sutra were written in India.

Guang Xing speaks of how the Mahayanists of the Nirvana Sutra understand the mahaparinirvana to be the liberated Self of the eternal Buddha:

Only in Mahaparinirvana is this True Self held to be fully discernible and accessible.

Kosho Yamamoto cites a passage in which the Buddha admonishes his monks not to dwell inordinately on the idea of the non-Self but to meditate on the Self. Yamamoto writes:

Michael Zimmermann, in his study of the Tathagatagarbha Sutra, reveals that not only the Mahaparinirvana Sutra but also the Tathagatagarbha Sutra and the Lankavatara Sutra speak affirmatively of the Self. Zimmermann observes:

See also
 Mahasamādhi
 Parinirvana Day
 Prabashvara
 Reclining Buddha

Notes

Sources

External links

Complete translation of the Mahayana Mahaparinirvana Sutra or PDF
SN VI.15: Parinibbana Sutta – Total Unbinding
 Article in The New York Times Buddha in Nirvana

Buddhist philosophical concepts
Gautama Buddha

de:Nirwana#Parinirvana